Dubai One (formerly known as Ch33 and then One TV) is a Pan Arab English language entertainment television channel, owned by Dubai Media Incorporated. It was launched on 14 May 1994, and is currently managed by Sarah al Jarman. It airs a mix of locally produced and international syndicated content that caters both Arab and non-Arab viewers in the MENA region. It started broadcasting in HD on Nilesat 201 on 28 February 2019.

Background 
Dubai One broadcasts subtitled Western content targeting Arabs and expatriates living in Dubai and around the Arab world. While most of the production is centralized at DMI's own studios, the channel has its own management, team, structure and strategy. The flow of advertising for it is controlled by Choueiri Group, through its subsidiary MEMS.

History 
 
The channel was launched as a replacement for Channel 33. Dubai One launched on 5 April 2004, bearing a new name with brand new programming targeting the expat community and westernized Arabs.

Programming 

Generally, Dubai One broadcasts syndicated programming from the United States and occasionally from Canada, the United Kingdom and Australia. Owing to its special partnerships with Warner Bros. and Walt Disney Studios, the channel currently offers at least four films per day from 5pm  to 12am , and has screened to date more than 300 films. Bollywood films are shown once a month, on a Thursday at 7pm . Dubai One also repeats programming it has broadcast during the week on Fridays, known as Catch Up Fridays.

The channel broadcasts also a variety of in-house productions including Emirates News, Dubai One Minute and Fashion Star. Previous productions include Emirates 24/7, World of Sports, Studio One, That's Entertainment and Understanding Islam.

On air staff 

 Yunus Saif @yunussaif
 Greg Fairlie @gregfairlie
 Amal Al Jabry 
 Dareen Abu Ghaida
 Aishwarya Ajit
 Ray Addison
 Marwan Al Awadhi
 Leila ben Khalifa
 Dina Butti
 Omar Butti
 Graham Clews
 Faraz Javed
 Priyanka Dutt
 Ramia Farrage
 Katie Jensen
 Rebecca McLaughlin
 Layne Redman
 Tom Urquhart

See also 

 Dubai Media Incorporated
 Television in the United Arab Emirates

References

External links 

 

 
Television stations in Dubai
Mass media in Dubai